Calista may refer to:
 Calista, Western Australia, a suburb of Perth, Western Australia
 Calista, Kansas, a community in the United States
 Calista Corporation, an Alaska Native Regional Corporation

People with the given name
 Calista Flockhart, American actress
 Calista Vinton (1807–1864), American Baptist missionary 
 Calista Robertson, contestant on Big Brother: Celebrity Hijack

See also
 Callista (disambiguation)